This table contains international rankings of Finland, including previous years when available.

 

This is a helper page for the article Finland, which is to accommodate a maximum of three years per survey to keep the article size from growing oversized.

See also

 List of Finland-related topics

References

External links
Finland among the best in the world at Statistics Finland

Finland